DFR may refer to:

 Cosworth DFR, a 1987 race car engine
 Dean Forest Railway, Gloucestershire, England
 Decreasing failure rate
 Deutscher Frauenring, a  political advocacy organisation in Germany
 Dihydroflavonol 4-reductase, an enzyme class
 Divergence-from-randomness model, in information retrieval
 Dounreay Fast Reactor, Scotland
 Dual fluid reactor